Bonut or Benut may refer to:
 Benut-e Bala
 Benut-e Pain
 Benut a mukim in Pontian District, Johor, Malaysia.